Kinging may refer to:

Kinging, piece-promoting move in draughts (including checkers)
Kinging, sexual practice of facesitting
Kinging, a.k.a. drag kinging